Derek Harrison may refer to:

 Derek Harrison (cyclist) (born 1944), British Olympic cyclist
 Derek Harrison (footballer) (born 1950), English footballer
 Derek Harrison (speedway rider) (born 1959), British speedway rider
 Derek Harrison (police officer) (1927–2011), British police officer

See also
 Derrick Harrison (1929–1967), rugby league footballer of the 1950s